Twilight Time is the second studio album by the power metal band Stratovarius. The album was originally recorded and released in the band's native Finland as Stratovarius II in early 1992 by Bluelight Records, followed by a reissue in Europe with different cover art in October of that year by Shark Records. A third edition was issued in Japan in July 1993 by Victor Entertainment, renaming the album Twilight Time with yet another cover design; this is the most common version in circulation today. On the back cover, bassist Jari Behm appears in a band photo and is credited with playing, but all bass parts on the album were actually performed by the guitarist and then-bandleader Timo Tolkki.

Critical reception

Steve Huey at AllMusic notes that Twilight Time significantly helped to establish Stratovarius' popularity in Japan, and that the band's "melodic, retro-British/power metal sound really started to jell."

Track listing

Personnel
Timo Tolkki – vocals, guitar, bass guitar, production
Antti Ikonen – keyboard, production
Tuomo Lassila – drums, percussion, production
Juha Heininen – engineering, mixing

References

External links
II at stratovarius.com
Twilight Time at stratovarius.com

Stratovarius albums
1992 albums
1993 albums
Victor Entertainment albums